Adawso is a farming community in the Akuapem North Municipal District in the Eastern Region of Ghana. It is located along the Koforidua-Mamfe highway.

Infrastructure 

 Adawso Bridge over Afram River
 Adawso Chief Palace
 Adawso Fire Service Station

Notable residents 

 Nathan Quao
 Charles Odamtten Easmon
 Nicholas Timothy Clerk
 Jane Elizabeth Clerk
 Lawrence Henry Yaw Ofosu-Appiah
 Matilda Johanna Clerk
 Ernest Papa Arko
 Nicholas Timothy Clerk
 Carl Henry Clerk
 Peter Hall (minister)
 Charles Sterling Acolatse

References 

Eastern Region (Ghana)
Communities in Ghana